Stephen MacKenzie (born 23 November 1961) is an English former footballer who played mostly as an attacking midfielder.

Playing career
After beginning as an apprentice at Crystal Palace, he signed for Manchester City in 1979 for £250,000, then a record for a teenager. The move attracted considerable attention because MacKenzie had yet to play a Football League match. He spent two seasons at Maine Road, and his second season coincided with the replacement of Malcolm Allison with John Bond and an upturn in fortunes. He gained renown for scoring spectacular goals, most notably in the 1981 FA Cup Final replay against Tottenham Hotspur.

He moved to West Bromwich Albion and spent six seasons at the Hawthorns before joining Charlton Athletic. He later played for Sheffield Wednesday and Shrewsbury Town, and had a spell managing non-league Atherstone United.

He is a cousin of former Arsenal and England captain, Tony Adams.

Honours
Manchester City
FA Cup runner-up: 1980–81
England U21
UEFA European Under-21 Championship: 1982

References

External links
 

1961 births
Living people
Footballers from Romford
English footballers
England under-21 international footballers
Association football midfielders
Crystal Palace F.C. players
Manchester City F.C. players
West Bromwich Albion F.C. players
Charlton Athletic F.C. players
Sheffield Wednesday F.C. players
Shrewsbury Town F.C. players
Willenhall Town F.C. players
Gresley F.C. players
English Football League players
English football managers
Atherstone Town F.C. managers
FA Cup Final players